Geluchar (also Romanized as Gelūchār; also known as Galū Jār) is a village in Hanza Rural District, Hanza District, Rabor County, Kerman Province, Iran. At the 2006 census, its population was 39, in 11 families.

References 

Populated places in Rabor County